Dirección General de Aviación Civil (Spanish for "Directorate General of Civil Aviation") can refer to:

 Dirección General de Aviación Civil (Costa Rica), the national civil aviation authority of Costa Rica
 Dirección General de Aviación Civil (Ecuador), the national civil aviation authority of Ecuador
 Dirección General de Aviación Civil (Spain), the national civil aviation authority of Spain

See also
 Dirección General de Aeronáutica Civil (disambiguation), Spanish for "Directorate General of Civil Aeronautics," the national civil aviation authority of various Spanish-speaking countries
 Directorate General of Civil Aeronautics (disambiguation), the name of the national civil aviation authority of various countries
 Directorate General of Civil Aviation (disambiguation), the name of the national civil aviation authority of various countries